Order of Mercy may also refer to the:

Order of the Blessed Virgin Mary of Mercy, a Catholic religious order.
Order of the League of Mercy, a former British royal order.